Black Day Blue Night is a 1995 American crime thriller film directed by J. S. Cardone and starring Gil Bellows, Michelle Forbes, Mia Sara, J. T. Walsh, Tim Guinee, and John Beck.

Premise 
A wife's husband is cheating on her. She decides to go on a road trip with her husband's other woman. While driving the two women pick up a hitchhiker. The man they pick up may be a robber and murderer on the run from the cops. A policeman who is tracking the hitchhiker has a close eye on them, but the question is why?

Cast 
 Gil Bellows as Hitchhiker Dodge
 Michelle Forbes as Rinda Woolley
 Mia Sara as Hallie Schrag
 J. T. Walsh as Lt. John Quinn
 Tim Guinee as Bo Schrag
 John Beck as Chief Morris Reed
 F. J. Flynn as Odell
 Norman Patrick Brown as Begay
 Benjamin Lum as Hop Chung
 Kellye Nakahara as Fat Mama
 Michael Holmes as Bus Clerk
 Thomas Redhouse as Navajo Man
 Caroline Barclay as Dutton
 Kirk Baily as Mayors Assistant
 Jack Leal as Trooper #1
 Beth Ann Styne as Patsy Petlow
 Dale Swann as Patrolman
 Melody Rae as Counter Girl
 Bill Watkins as Minister
 K. C. Brooks as Mrs. Reed
 Gerry Giss as Trading Post Owner
 Raylene Begay as Native American Waitress
 Daiton Rutkowski as Trucker
 Dave Adams as Vern Pender
 Jennifer Taliman as Navajo Woman
 Clotairo as himself

Reception 
Entertainment Weekly said, "Black Day Blue Night is a surprisingly pleasant ride," giving it a B−.

References

External links
 

1995 films
1995 crime thriller films
American crime drama films
American crime thriller films
American independent films
Films directed by J. S. Cardone
1990s English-language films
1990s American films
1995 independent films